Coon Family Log Cabin is a historic log cabin located near Beaver Dams in Schuyler County, New York.  It was built between 1938 and 1945, and is a one-story, irregularly shaped log dwelling with concrete chinking.  It is a side gable roof and large stone chimney.  Its design and construction was based on local Civilian Conservation Corps camp architecture. Also on the property are the contributing -story large frame barn and shed both built about 1955.  It served as a residence for the Coon Family until 1959 and then briefly as a local museum.

It was listed on the National Register of Historic Places in 2015.

References

Log cabins in the United States
Houses on the National Register of Historic Places in New York (state)
Houses completed in 1945
Buildings and structures in Schuyler County, New York
National Register of Historic Places in Schuyler County, New York
Log buildings and structures on the National Register of Historic Places in New York (state)